On the Spot is an Australian television program which aired from 1959 to 1960 on Melbourne station GTV-9. It was a religious panel discussion program moderated by Douglas Tasker. It debuted 6 December 1959 and ran for approximately a year. It was reported in May 1960 as having an audience of 50,000 viewers.

References

External links
 

1959 Australian television series debuts
1960 Australian television series endings
Australian television talk shows
Black-and-white Australian television shows
English-language television shows